The 2021–22 season was the 112th season in the existence of AC Ajaccio and the club's ninth consecutive season in the second division of French football. In addition to the domestic league, Ajaccio participated in this season's edition of the Coupe de France.

Players

First-team squad
As of 12 October 2021.

Out on loan

Transfers

Pre-season and friendlies

Competitions

Overall record

Ligue 2

League table

Results summary

Results by round

Matches
The league fixtures were announced on 25 June 2021.

Coupe de France

References

AC Ajaccio seasons
Ajaccio